İsabeyli is a town in Nazilli district of Aydın Province, Turkey. Situated at  it is between Aydın (to west) and Nazilli (to east). The population of İsabeyli was 4943  as of 2012. The name of the town refers to a certain Turkmen leader named İsa who founded the village in 1600s. The settlement was declared a seat of township in 1963. A part of Adnan Menderes University (Aydın University)  campus is in İsabeyli.

References

Populated places in Aydın Province
Towns in Turkey
Nazilli District